Kalinga may refer to:

Geography, linguistics and/or ethnology

 Kalinga (historical region), a historical region of India
 Kalinga (Mahabharata), an apocryphal kingdom mentioned in classical Indian literature
 Kalinga script, an ancient writing system invented in the ancient Kingdom of Kalinga
 Kalinga architecture
 Kalinga (caste), an Indian caste found between the districts of Ganjam and Vizagapatam
 Kalinga War, fought  between the Maurya Empire under Ashoka and the state of Kalinga
Kalinga people, an ethnic group in the Philippines
Kalinga language, spoken in the Philippines
Kalinga-Apayao, a former province in the Philippines
Kalinga (province), in the Philippines
Kalinga, Queensland, a suburb of Brisbane, Australia
 Kalinga Park, a park in the same suburb
 Kalingga, an ancient Indianized kingdom in Java

Musical instruments
 Kalinga or galinga, a musical instrument known otherwise as the ground bow  
Kalinga, the sacred, dynastic drum of Rwanda, known elsewhere in Africa as Ngoma drums

Others
Kalinga (film), a 2006 Tamil-language film from India
Kalinga (gastropod), a genus of sea slugs
Kalinga Airlines, a private airline based in Calcutta
Kalinga Prize, a UNESCO prize awarded for the popularisation of science
Kalinga Stadium, Bhubaneswar, Odisha, India
26214 Kalinga, an asteroid
INS Kalinga, an Indian Navy establishment at Visakhapatnam

Language and nationality disambiguation pages